Mordellistena incerta is a beetle in the genus Mordellistena of the family Mordellidae. It was described in 1965 by Ermisch.

References

incerta
Beetles described in 1965